Earlene Hill Hooper is an American politician who represented District 18 in the New York State Assembly from 1988 to 2018. Hooper's district included large portions of Nassau County. Hooper served as the first female Deputy Speaker of the Assembly from 2009 to 2018.
First elected in a special election held on March 15, 1988, Hooper was (at one time) the only  New York state legislator of color from Long Island.

A former social worker, with a B.A. in English from Norfolk State University and a Master's in Social Work from Adelphi University, she previously served as an administrator in New York State's Department of Social Services Division of Child and Family Services.

Hooper also served on the Democratic Platform Committee during 1988.

On September 13, 2018, Hooper was defeated in the Democratic primary by psychologist and political newcomer Taylor Raynor, who was described as "a loose jezebel that has two kids and no husband" in fliers spread within the assembly district. Hooper was criticized during her campaign for comparing Raynor to a slave and comparing Nassau County Democratic Committee chairman Jay Jacobs to a plantation owner.

References 

1930s births
Living people
People from Nassau County, New York
Deputy Speakers of the New York State Assembly
Democratic Party members of the New York State Assembly
African-American state legislators in New York (state)
Adelphi University alumni
Norfolk State University alumni
Women state legislators in New York (state)
21st-century American politicians
21st-century American women politicians
20th-century American politicians
20th-century American women politicians
Politicians from Baltimore
20th-century African-American women
20th-century African-American politicians
21st-century African-American women
21st-century African-American politicians